Yacouba Sylla (born 29 November 1990) is a professional footballer who plays as a defensive midfielder for Belgian First Division B side Virton. Born in France, he represented France as a youth international before switching to Mali at senior level.

Club career

Youth career
Prior to joining Clermont, where Sylla signed his first professional contract, he had a year's stint with Ligue 1 club Caen. Before that, Sylla had started his career with hometown Parisian club Étampes FC, before joining nearby club CSF Brétigny, which produced France internationals Patrice Evra and Jimmy Briand. After four years in Brétigny, Sylla spent the next four years roaming around clubs in the Lower Normandy region such as Montferrand, Malesherbes, and Caen. And then in 2009, he signed an amateur contract with Clermont where he was inserted into Clermont's reserve team for the 2009–10 season. He appeared in 17 matches scoring one goal.

Clermont
For the 2010–11 season, Sylla was promoted to the senior team by manager Michel Der Zakarian. He made his professional debut on 15 October 2010 in a league match against Le Mans playing the entire match in a 2–0 defeat. Sylla subsequently appeared as a starter in the team's next seven matches. His performances domestically led to interest from German club VfB Stuttgart and Italian club Udinese. In order to decrease the interest Clermont signed Sylla to his first professional contract, which ran from 22 November 2010 until June 2014.

Aston Villa
On 31 January 2013, Aston Villa completed the signing of Sylla on a three-and-a-half-year deal, subject to international clearance, after passing a medical.

Loan to Kayseri Erciyesspor
On 14 July 2014, Sylla joined Turkish Super Lig club Kayseri Erciyesspor on a season-long loan.

Rennes
On 22 June 2015, Sylla joined Rennes on a four-year deal, after two years at Aston Villa where he made only 22 league appearances.

Loan to Panathinaikos
On 30 August 2017, Panathinaikos officially announced the signing of Malian international defensive midfielder Yacouba Sylla. He joined the Greens on loan from Rennes until the end of 2017–18 season and was the 10th summer signing of the Athens club.

Mechelen
On 17 January 2018, Sylla signed a contract with YR KV Mechelen until 2021. He leaves Rennes after having been on loan at Panathinaikos since the end of August.

Strømsgodset
On 1 March 2019, Sylla signed a contract until the end of the 2020 season with Norwegian club Strømsgodset Toppfotball. On 19 May, Sylla scored his first and only goal for the Norwegians, in a 3–1 win against Tromsø IL.

CFR Cluj
On 1 July 2019, he signed a three-year contract with CFR Cluj, Romanian champions.

Mouloudia 
On 27 October 2020, Sylla joined Botola side MC Oudja on a two-year deal.

Bastia 
On 13 December 2021, Sylla signed for Ligue 2 side Bastia on a contract until the end of the season.

Botoșani
On 26 July 2022, Sylla joined Botoșani in Romania with a one-year contract with an option to extend.

International career

France
Sylla was born in France but has Malian heritage, which meant that he was eligible to represent either France or Mali. He made one appearance for France's under-21 team on 24 March 2011, in a 3–2 friendly victory over Spain. Sylla was a late substitute for Antoine Griezmann and played the final few minutes of the game.

Mali
Following his move to Aston Villa and positive form towards the end to the 2012–13 season, Sylla was called up to represent Mali for the first time. He first played in an unofficial friendly against the national team of Brittany, France, a side not affiliated with FIFA or UEFA on 28 May 2013. Mali lost 1–0.

Sylla's official, full international début for Mali came on 9 June 2012 in a 1–1 FIFA World Cup qualification draw with Rwanda. Sylla replaced Wolverhampton Wanderers player Tongo Doumbia in the 70th minute. Sylla started and played the full 90 minutes in Mali's 2–2 draw with Benin seven days later, but Mali were unfortunately eliminated from the competition.

Personal life
Sylla is the older brother of the France youth international Moussa Sylla.

Career statistics

Club

International

Honours
CFR Cluj
Liga I: 2019–20
Supercupa României runner-up: 2019

References

External links
 
 

1990 births
Living people
People from Étampes
Footballers from Essonne
French people of Malian descent
French footballers
France under-21 international footballers
Malian footballers
Mali international footballers
Association football midfielders
2015 Africa Cup of Nations players
2017 Africa Cup of Nations players
Clermont Foot players
Aston Villa F.C. players
Kayseri Erciyesspor footballers
Stade Rennais F.C. players
Montpellier HSC players
Panathinaikos F.C. players
K.V. Mechelen players
Strømsgodset Toppfotball players
CFR Cluj players
SC Bastia players
FC Botoșani players
R.E. Virton players
Ligue 1 players
Ligue 2 players
Premier League players
Süper Lig players
Super League Greece players
Belgian Pro League players
Challenger Pro League players
Eliteserien players
Liga I players
French expatriate footballers
Malian expatriate footballers
Expatriate footballers in England
French expatriate sportspeople in England
Malian expatriate sportspeople in England
Expatriate footballers in Turkey
French expatriate sportspeople in Turkey
Malian expatriate sportspeople in Turkey
Expatriate footballers in Greece
French expatriate sportspeople in Greece
Malian expatriate sportspeople in Greece
Expatriate footballers in Belgium
French expatriate sportspeople in Belgium
Malian expatriate sportspeople in Belgium
Expatriate footballers in Norway
French expatriate sportspeople in Norway
Malian expatriate sportspeople in Norway
Expatriate footballers in Morocco
French expatriate sportspeople in Morocco
Malian expatriate sportspeople in Morocco
Expatriate footballers in Romania
French expatriate sportspeople in Romania
Malian expatriate sportspeople in Romania